Rafael Arévalo González (born July 4, 1986) is a retired professional tennis player from El Salvador. The majority of Arévalo's professional career has been restricted to playing on the Futures (ITF) circuit, with a further 22 appearances for the El Salvador Davis Cup team; he also encountered modest success in the juniors, reaching a peak of No. 10 in 2004. However, in 2008, aided by the Salvadoran Tennis Federation (Federación Salvadoreña de Tenis), he was awarded an invitation to the 2008 Beijing Olympics tennis tournament. The Tripartite Commission, which issued the invitation, is composed of representatives from International Olympic Committee (IOC), National Olympic Committees (NOCs), and the International Tennis Federation (ITF), and it is standard practice to award such invitations (of which there were two for the men's singles tennis event) to countries with small Olympic teams. Arévalo was the first player from El Salvador to represent the country, in a tennis competition, at the Olympics. Arévalo defeated Lee Hyung-taik in three sets in the first round, before being beaten by Swiss World No. 1 Roger Federer in the second.

He is the brother of tennis player Marcelo Arévalo, with whom he plays on the El Salvador Davis Cup team.

He is known in his home city of Sonsonate as 'Cabeza de Cono', which translates to Conehead.

Arévalo played his last match at the 2019 Davis Cup where he partnered his brother, Marcelo, in a doubles match against Peru. Soon after, he became president of the El Salvador Davis Cup team.

Notes

References

External links
 
 
 
 Quick Tennis Academy

Salvadoran male tennis players
1986 births
Living people
Tennis players at the 2008 Summer Olympics
Olympic tennis players of El Salvador
Tennis players at the 2011 Pan American Games
Pan American Games competitors for El Salvador
Tennis players at the 2007 Pan American Games
Tennis players at the 2003 Pan American Games